Canarium microurceus is a species of sea snail, a marine gastropod mollusk in the family Strombidae, the true conchs.

Description

Distribution

Phylogeny

In 2006, Latiolais and colleagues proposed a cladogram (a tree of descent) that attempts to show the phylogenetic relationships of 34 species within the family Strombidae. The authors analysed 31 species in the genus Strombus including Canarium microurceus (referred to as Strombus microurceus in their analysis), and three species in the allied genus Lambis. The cladogram was based on DNA sequences of both nuclear histone H3 and mitochondrial cytochrome-c oxidase I (COI) protein-coding gene regions. In this proposed phylogeny, Strombus labiatus (= Canarium labiatum) and Strombus microurceus are closely related and appear to share a common ancestor.

References

Strombidae
Gastropods described in 1959